Tebenna yamashitai is a moth in the family Choreutidae. It was described by Yutaka Arita in 1987. It is found in Japan.

References

Arctiidae genus list at Butterflies and Moths of the World of the Natural History Museum

Choreutidae
Moths described in 1987